Joshua Lafazan (born January 29, 1994) is an American politician and a member of the Nassau County (New York) Legislature from the 18th district. When elected to the Syosset School Board in 2012, he was the youngest elected official in New York State. He was a candidate to become the Democratic nominee for New York's 3rd congressional district in the 2022 United States House of Representatives election.

Education

Lafazan attended Nassau Community College and received the State University of New York Chancellor's Award for Student Excellence. Lafazan attended Cornell University for his Bachelor of Science degree and Harvard University for his Master of Education degree. He is pursuing doctoral studies at the University of Pennsylvania.

Career 

As a high school senior at Syosset High School, he started a volunteer rideshare program to prevent drunk driving to drive teenagers home safely.

During the latter part of his senior year of high school, Lafazan campaigned for a trustee position on the Syosset Board of Education. In May 2012, he won with 82 percent of the vote. He was the first high school student elected to the school board and upon his election, the youngest elected official in New York State. He was re-elected to the board in 2015 for another three-year term. Lafazan resigned from his position on the school board in 2017 after becoming an elected legislator, as required by county charter.

Lafazan was named on the Long Island Press Power List of the 50 most influential people on Long Island in 2012. He published Political Gladiators: How Millennials Can Navigate the 21st Century Political Minefield and WIN! in November 2015, a book about the experiences of other politicians who were elected at a young age.

In 2017, Lafazan ran for the Nassau County Legislature's 18th district against incumbent Republican Donald MacKenzie and won with 56 percent of the vote. Lafazan was re-elected to the county legislature in 2019 and 2021. As a county legislator, Lafazan authored and passed "Timothy's Law" in August 2018, which established a county hotline for substance abuse intervention. Related legislation would create a smartphone application with resources for substance abuse, such as treatment center locations. His proposed "Dignity for Heroes" package marked veterans as a protected status under the county's human rights law.

Lafazan teaches a course on how to run for public office as a young candidate as adjunct professor at Long Island University.

In December 2021 he announced his candidacy to become the Democratic nominee for the 2022 United States House of Representatives election for New York's 3rd congressional district. He has committed to term limits for the US Congress. He placed third in the race for primary.

References

External links
Josh Lafazan for Congress

1994 births
21st-century American politicians
Cornell University alumni
Harvard Graduate School of Education alumni
Living people
Nassau Community College alumni
Syosset High School alumni